The 1979 Fastnet Race was the 28th Royal Ocean Racing Club's Fastnet Race, a yachting race held generally every two years since 1925 on a 605-mile course from Cowes direct to the Fastnet Rock and then to Plymouth via south of the Isles of Scilly. In 1979, it was the climax of the five-race Admiral's Cup competition, as it had been since 1957.

A worse-than-expected storm on the third day of the race wreaked havoc on the 303 yachts that started the biennial race, resulting in 19 fatalities (15 yachtsmen and four spectators). Emergency services, naval forces, and civilian vessels from around the west side of the English Channel were summoned to aid what became the largest ever rescue operation in peace-time. This involved some 4,000 people, including the entire Irish Naval Service's fleet, lifeboats, commercial boats, and helicopters.

Build-up
The 1979 race started on 11 August. The BBC Radio Shipping Forecast, broadcast at 13:55 that day predicted "south-westerly winds, force four to five increasing to force six to seven for a time." By 13 August, winds were reported at Force 6, with gusts of Force 7. Forecasters were predicting winds of Force 8. The leading boat, Kialoa, trailed closely by Condor of Bermuda, was on course to break the Fastnet record set eight years earlier.

Meteorological history
A large depression, known as "low Y", formed over the Atlantic Ocean during the weekend of 11–12 August. On 13 August it began to intensify rapidly and turn northeastwards, reaching about 200 nautical miles southwest of Ireland. By the 14th, the low was centred over Wexford. Land-based weather stations reported gale-force winds, with the strongest winds out to sea over the race area. The Meteorological Office assessed the maximum winds as Force 10 on the Beaufort scale; many race competitors believed the winds to have reached Force 11. The lowest pressure was 979 hPa.

Disaster and rescue mission
Over 13–14 August, of the 303 yachts that started, 24 were abandoned, of which five were lost and believed to be sunk, due to high winds and severe sea conditions. The Daily Telegraph (15 August 1979, p. 1) described the situation, where "Royal Navy ships, RAF Nimrod jets, helicopters, lifeboats, a Dutch warship HNLMS Overijssel and other craft picked up 125 yachtsmen whose boats had been caught in Force 11 violent storm strength gusts midway between Land's End and Fastnet". The effort also included tugs, trawlers, and tankers. Rescue efforts began after 6:30 am on 14 August, once the winds had dropped to severe gale Force 9.

Fifteen sailors died, at least 75 boats capsized and five sank. Adopting heaving to as a storm tactic proved to be a good preventive of capsize and turtling during the race. Lin Pardey wrote that none of the yachts which hove to were capsized or suffered any serious damage, but the official inquiry makes no such conclusion. One Fastnet participant, John Rousmaniere, wrote that

The disaster resulted in a major rethink of racing, risks and prevention.

The coastguard requested support resulting in a Nimrod aircraft from RAF Kinloss being ordered to the scene to act as the Scene of Search Coordinator.

Finishing yachts
The handicap winner was the yacht Tenacious, designed by Sparkman & Stephens, owned and skippered by Ted Turner. The winner on elapsed time in the race was the 77-foot SV Condor of Bermuda, skippered by Peter Blake, which gained around 90 minutes on the leader, the SV Kialoa, after rounding the Fastnet rock, by the calculated risk of setting a spinnaker sail in the high wind conditions. Jim Kilroy of the Kialoa had broken his ribs and there was damage to the yacht's runners. SV Condor of Bermuda broke the Fastnet record by nearly eight hours (71h 37m 23s).

Handicap results all classes (first three in each class)

<ref>1979 Fastnet Race Results & Season Point Winners, Royal Ocean Racing Club</ref>

Notes

Vessels that did not finish
Of the 303 starters, only 86 finished. There were 194 retirements and 24 abandonments (five of which were "lost believed sunk").

Early press reports were often confused. The Daily Telegraph (16 August 1979, p. 3) reported that 69 yachts did not finish.

  Accanito of France, broken rudder. Towed.
  Allamader. Abandoned.
  Alpha II  Amanda Kulu  Andiano Robin  Angustura  Animal  Ariadne. Abandoned. *
  Arkadina  Asteries  Autonomy. Towed to Dunmore East.
  Ballydonna  Battle Cry  Billy Bones. Abandoned.
  Blue Dolphin  Bonaventure of Britain. Abandoned.
  Cabadah Ocean Wave Option  Callirhaex 3. Abandoned.
  Camargue of Britain. Abandoned.
  Casse Tete  Charioteer of Britain. Sunk.
  Combat II. Retired to Cork.
  Corker  Crazy Horse  Détente  Double O Two  Enia  Evergreen  Farthing  Fiestina Tertia. Abandoned. *
  Finndabar. Abandoned.
  Gan. Abandoned.
  Gekko  Golden Apple of Ireland, disabled. Abandoned. Crew rescued by RAF Lynx helicopter.
  Golden Leigh  Good in Tension A High Tension 36. Two Knockdowns. Retired from race. Sailed to Crosshaven, Cork. Towed within the harbour by Fishing vessel Mona Lisa  Griffin Abandoned - crew rescued from liferaft by Lorelei  Grimalkin. Abandoned and subsequently recovered. Read John Rousmaniere's Fastnet, Force 10 and Nick Ward's Left for Dead.
  Gringo. Reported as 'believed sunk'.
  Gunslinger Broken rudder stock
  Hestral. Abandoned. Crew of 6 rescued by Royal Navy helicopter.
  Hoodlum  Impetuous  Innovation  Jan Pott of Germany, Flensburg. Broken mast.
  Juggernaut  Kamisado a UFO 34, apart from two knockdowns Kamisado coped effectively with the storm and retired to Plymouth.
  Kestel. Abandoned.
  Korsar  La Barbarelle  Little Ella  Magic of Britain. Sunk.
  Maligawa III. Abandoned.
  Marionette VII  MexxaniniMordicus Belgique won 1981 
  Morning Cloud of Britain, broken rudder.
  Morning Glory  Mulligatawny  Mutine  Pachena  Pegasus  Ocean Wave  Option2 of France, Granville
  Pepsi of Scotland. Broken rudder stock. Retired no steerage. Several knockdowns. No communications. After 24 hrs towed by a French Trawler into Kinsale.  
  Pepsi of Holland
  Pinball Wizard  Polar Bear of Britain. Sunk. Crew rescued.
  Polyhymnia. Retired and made own way back to Plymouth.
  Regardless of Cork, broken rudder. Towed by 
  Samurai II  Sandettie, a UFO 34 which was rolled, dismasted and swamped. However, Sandettie's crew were able to jury rig emergency rigging and sail to Lands End, where they were towed to Penzance
  Scaldis  Scaramouche. Retired and made own way back to Plymouth. Steve Cross  remarked: "Although we hadn't the satisfaction of being one of the 88 which rounded 'the rock' we were content in knowing that we had brought the boat and ourselves back in one piece."
  Schuttevaer of Holland
  Sinndkabar  Skat  Sophia  Sophie B  
  Tam O'Shanter  Tarantula of France 
  Thunderer RAOC  
  Trophy. Abandoned.
  Tiderace IV. Abandoned.
  Wild Goose of Singapore
  Yachtman of Spain
  ZapAlso
  Mulligatawny (not competing)Polar Bear was abandoned but remained afloat and raced again. She is berthed in Plymouth.

Craft that assisted the rescue mission
Over 4000 people aided in the rescue efforts. The Royal Navy coordinated efforts to find around 80 vessels and rescue 136 crew members.

Key contributors to the rescue

Coastguard
Maritime Rescue Co-ordination Centre, HMCG Lands End, UK
 MRCC Falmouth, UK
 MRCC Shannon, Ireland
 MRSC Brixham, UK
 Cross A, France

Royal Navy
 HMS Anglesey, Island class patrol vessel
 , frigate (Scene of Search Coordinator)
 , yacht
 HMS Scylla (Leander class frigate) 
 RMAS Rollicker A502, ocean-going salvage tug 
 RFA Tidespring, fast fleet tanker of the Royal Fleet Auxiliary
 15 Royal Navy helicopters from RNAS Culdrose and RNAS Prestwick, including
 Westland Sea Kings, 25 sorties for 110 hrs 45 mins, 
 Westland Lynxes 10 sorties for 20 hrs 55 mins and 
 Westland Wessexes, 27 sorties for 62 hrs 35 mins

Royal Netherlands Navy
 , destroyer (race guardship)

Irish Naval Service
, Deirdre class offshore patrol vessel

United States Navy
 , submarine tender, Holy Loch, Scotland

Lifeboats
These RNLI lifeboats spent 75 hours at sea in  winds:
 RNLB Guy and Claire Hunter, St Mary's Lifeboat, Isles of Scilly
 Baltimore Lifeboat, County Cork
 RNLB Ethel Mary, Ballycotton, County Cork
 Courtmacsherry, County Cork
 Dunmore East, County Waterford
 Lifeboat Solomon Browne Royal Air Force 
 Three helicopters
 Four Nimrods from RAF St Mawgan in Cornwall

Irish Air Corps
  Beechcraft Kingair maritime patrol
  Alouette helicopter

 Royal Ocean Racing Club (RORC) 
 Morningtown, Rodney Hill's Oyster 39 acted as the RORC escort and radio relay boat and was responsible for relaying the positions of the racing fleet.

Yachtsmen killed

Paul Baldwin
Robin Bowyer
SLt Russell Brown
David Crisp
Peter Dorey
Peter Everson
Frank Ferris
William Le Fevre
John Puxley
Robert Robie
David Sheahan
SLt Charles Steavenson
Roger Watts
Gerrit-Jan Williahey (Gerrit-Jan Willering)
Gerald Winks

The Fastnet Race Memorial at Holy Trinity Church, Cowes, Isle of Wight lists 19 fatalities: the 15 above and Olivia Davidson, John Dix, Richard Pendred, and Peter Pickering who were aboard Bucks Fizz, a yacht shadowing the fleet to view the race. Denis Benson and David Moore were lost from Tempean, which was not a competitor. Their names were added to the Fastnet memorial at Cape Clear Island harbour.

See also
1998 Sydney to Hobart Yacht Race
Contessa 32
J/30
UFO 34

References

Notes

Sources
 Tregoning, Martin, Acting District Controller, Senior SAR Mission Controller HMCG Lands End.

 Fairchild, Tony (14 August 1979) Kiaola heads for Fastnet record The Daily Telegraph, p. 26
 Fairchild, Tony (15 August 1979) Killer wind gives Condor record The Daily Telegraph, p. 29
 Fairchild, Tony (16 August 1979) Fastnet may be limited to fewer Yachts The Daily Telegraph, p. 3.

 
 Rais, Guy and Bramwell, Christopher (15 August 1979) 10 die in yacht race havoc The Daily Telegraph, p. 1 & 32.
 
 
 
 

 Wettern, Desmond (20 August 1979) Fastnet race rescue operation involved 4,000 people The Daily Telegraph'', p. 2.

Further reading

External links

Fastnet race
Fastnet Race, 1979
Shipwrecks of the Isles of Scilly
Cornish shipwrecks
Fastnet
Fastnet
Fastnet
Fastnet
Fastnet
Fastnet
Fastnet race
European windstorms
Shipwrecks of Ireland
August 1979 events in the United Kingdom